Words and Pictures can refer to:

 Words & Pictures, a British art magazine in the 1990s
 Words and Pictures (album), a 1997 album by Bob Snider
 Words and Pictures (film), a 2013 American film
 Words and Pictures (TV programme), a British children's television series that ran from 1970-2001 on BBC
 Words and Pictures, a 2011 album by Nu:Tone